The 1960 Illinois gubernatorial election was held in Illinois on November 8, 1960. Incumbent Governor William Stratton, a Republican seeking a third term, lost reelection to Democrat Otto Kerner Jr.

Election information
The primaries and general election both coincided with those for federal offices (United States President, House, and United States Senate) and those for other state offices. The election was part of the 1960 Illinois elections.

Background
Heading into this election, Stratton was seen as vulnerable to being unseated if the Democrats ran a strong candidate, as he had only narrowly won reelection in 1956 (despite a strong overall performance by the Republican party in the state that year), and since the Democratic Party had nationally had a strong performance in the 1958 elections.

Turnout
In the primaries, turnout was 37.54%, with 1,910,956 votes cast.

In the general election, turnout was 84.99%, with 4,674,187 votes cast.

Primaries
Primaries were held on April 12, 1960.

Democratic primary
Names floated as potential Democratic contenders included Chicago mayor Richard J. Daley. Daley opted not to run. Daley, the head of the Cook County Democratic Party and a political boss, helped slate Otto Kerner for the nomination. Kerner won the Democratic primary.

Candidates

Ran
Otto Kerner Jr., judge of the Illinois Circuit Court of Cook County
Joseph D. Lohman, treasurer of Illinois and former Cook County sheriff
Stephen A. Mitchell, former chairman of the Democratic National Committee

Declined to run
John Edward Cassidy, former Illinois attorney general
Richard J. Daley, mayor of Chicago and chairman of the Cook County Democratic Party
John Gleason, vice president of First National Bank of Chicago and former national commander of the American Legion
Scott W. Lucas, former United States senator
James L. O'Keefe, 1956 Democratic nominee for Illinois attorney general
Paul Powell, speaker of the Illinois House of Representatives
Sargent Shriver, president of the Chicago Board of Education
John Stelle, former governor of Illinois

Results

Republican

General election

References 

Illinois
Illinois gubernatorial elections
gubernatorial